Insh is an alternative spelling of the Scots word "inch", itself derived from the Gaelic innis, meaning "island" or "meadow". Insh may refer to:

 Insh, a village in Speyside
 Insh Island, one of the Slate Islands off the west coast of Argyll
 Loch Insh in Speyside
 Insh Marshes an RSPB wildlife reserve, in Speyside

See also
 Insch, a village in the Garioch, Aberdeenshire
 Inshes, a district of Inverness
 Scottish inch, a unit of measurement
 
 , including islands named "Inch ..."